P. David Ebersole (born March 16, 1964 in Los Angeles, California) is an American television director, independent filmmaker, and novelist. He began his film career as a child actor, playing the lead in the musical Junior High School (1978), which also starred Paula Abdul.

Career
Stepping behind the camera, as an undergraduate he won Best Film and Best Director at NYU for his first effort, "Lover Man" (1986), and earned his MFA winning AFI's Franklin J. Schaffner award for best film/best director for his student thesis project, "Death in Venice, CA" (1994). He directed the boxing film "Straight Right" (2000) that premiered on Sundance Channel, and was a director on two telenovelas for Fox Television airing on My Network TV, Desire (2006) and Wicked Wicked Games (2007) starring Tatum O'Neal.

He was co-producer of the HBO original film,Stranger Inside (2001) and the independent film The New Women (2001) starring Mary Woronov. He directed and edited his first documentary Hit So Hard about drummer Patty Schemel of the seminal grunge band Hole (band), which had its world premiere at SXSW 2011 and was released theatrically in 2012. Along with his husband and business partner Todd Hughes, he was Executive Producer of Room 237, a subjective documentary that explores the numerous theories about the hidden meanings within Stanley Kubrick's film "The Shining."

Ebersole is writer/director and Executive Producer of Dear Mom, Love Cher, a documentary about Georgia Holt, the mother of international superstar Cher. [1] Independently produced by The Ebersole Hughes Company and APIS Productions, it premiered on Lifetime May 6, 2013.

His film Mansfield 66/67, premiered at the 2017 International Film Festival Rotterdam (IFFR) where Paris-based International sales outfit Stray Dogs picked up worldwide rights. The film is about the last two years of movie goddess Jayne Mansfield’s life, and the rumors swirling around her untimely death being caused by a curse after her alleged romantic dalliance with Anton LaVey, head of the Church of Satan. Mansfield 66/67 is "a true story based on rumor and hearsay," celebrating Jayne's life on the 50th anniversary of her death.  Directed by Ebersole with his husband Todd Hughes, and produced by Ebersole, Hughes and Larra Anderson, it was released theatrically in North America for Halloween 2017 by Gunpowder & Sky.

In May 2022, Pelekinesis Press published Ebersole's first novel, 99 Miles From L.A, "a timely, intricately woven bisexual love triangle between a trio of desert-based criminals."

Personal life
He currently lives in Palm Springs, California, with his husband Todd Hughes.

Filmography

Director
 Mansfield 66/67 (2017)
Documentary Feature
 Dear Mom, Love Cher (2013)
TV Movie Documentary
 Hit So Hard (2011)
Documentary Feature
 "Swimming" (2010)
Short
 Wicked Wicked Games (2007)
TV Series/Telenovela, 65 episodes
 Desire (TV Series) (2006)
TV Series/Telenovela, 65 episodes
 Hot Chicks (2006)
Feature Compilation of shorts, segment "Doom Town"
 Straight Right (2000)
Narrative Feature
 "Death In Venice, CA" (1994)
Short

Producer
 Mansfield 66/67 (2017)
Documentary Feature
 Alaska Is A Drag (2016)
Narrative Feature, Executive Producer
 A Reunion (2014)
Narrative Feature, Executive Producer
 Dear Mom, Love Cher (2013)
TV Movie Documentary, Executive Producer
 Room 237 (2012)
Documentary Feature, Executive Producer
 The New Women (2001)
Narrative Feature, Co-producer
 Stranger Inside (2001)
TV Movie, co-producer

References

External links 

1964 births
Living people
American film directors
American television directors
LGBT film directors
LGBT television directors
American LGBT writers